Raj Music Kannada is a 24-hour music channel presented by Chennai-based Raj Television Network in Karnataka. This is the third Music channel for Karnataka. The channel went on air on 6 March 2009. Raj TV has tied up with MQ Networks Pvt. Ltd., a professionally managed multi media company for exclusively handling the Raj Music Karnataka operations in Karnataka. The channel became inactive and dull after a few months. However the channel was re-launched by the network on 14 February 2011. The channel was renamed as Raj Music Karnataka from Raj Musix Kannada along with the change in logo.

See also
List of Kannada-language television channels
Television in India
Media in Karnataka
Media of India

References

External links
 

Music television channels
Kannada-language television channels
Music organisations based in India
Television stations in Bangalore
2009 establishments in Karnataka
Television channels and stations established in 2009
Music television channels in India